The Turkish Indoor Athletics Championships is an annual indoor track and field competition organised by the Turkish Athletic Federation, which serves as the national championship for the sport in Turkey.

The competition was first held in 2012, following the construction of the country's first international quality indoor track and field stadium – the Ataköy Athletics Arena. This venue was constructed to host the 2012 IAAF World Indoor Championships.

Events
The following athletics events feature as standard on the Turkish Indoor Championships programme:

 Sprint: 60 m, 200 m, 400 m
 Distance track events: 800 m, 1500 m, 3000 m
 Hurdles: 60 m hurdles
 Jumps: long jump, triple jump, high jump, pole vault
 Throws: shot put
 Combined events: heptathlon (men), pentathlon (women)

Editions

Championships records

Men

Women

References

 

 
Athletics competitions in Turkey
National athletics competitions
Recurring sporting events established in 2012
2012 establishments in Turkey
Athletics Indoor
Sport in Bakırköy